Mohammad-Taqi (محمد تقی), also spelled as Muhammad Taqi or Mohammad Taghi is a common name among Muslims, specially Shia Muslims. It may refer to the following:

Muhammad al-Taqi (811 AD – 835), the 9th Shia Imam
Mohammad-Taqi Bahar (1884 — 1951), Iranian poet, scholar and politician
Muhammad Taqi-ud-Din al-Hilali (1893? - 1987?), Moroccan religious scholar
Mohammad-Taqi Bahjat Foumani (1913 – 2009), Iranian Twelver Shi'a  Marja
Mohammad-Taqi Ja'fari (born 1923), Iranian theologian
Mohammad-Taqi Mesbah-Yazdi (born 1934),  Iranian Twelver Shi'i cleric and politician
Mohamed Taki Abdoulkarim (1936 - 1998),President of the Comoros
Muhammad Taqi Usmani (born 1943), Pakistani Hanafi Islamic scholar
Mohammad Taqi al-Modarresi (born 1945), Iraqi marja
Kasim Muhammad Taqi al-Sahlani (born 1949), Iraqi politician
Mohamed Taki (athlete) (born 1971), Moroccan middle-distance runner
Muhammed Taqi (footballer) (born 1985), Omani footballer
Muhammad Taqi (referee) (born 1986), Singaporean football referee
Mohammad Taqi al-Khoei (died 1994), Iraqi cleric
Muhammad Taqi Khan Bahadur, Nawab of Masulipatam

Arabic masculine given names
Pakistani masculine given names